TILO is a limited company established in 2004 as a joint venture between Italian railway company Trenord and Swiss Federal Railways (SBB CFF FFS); both companies participate in the equity of TILO SA with participation of 50%.

The company's goal is to develop the regional cross-border traffic between the canton of Ticino and the Region of Lombardy.

In 2009 the company carried 6 million passengers. Most traveled along the Como ↔ Chiasso ↔ Mendrisio ↔ Lugano ↔ Bellinzona ↔ Biasca (S10) and Bellinzona ↔ Locarno routes (S20), served by trains every 30 minutes (every 15 minutes on average at peak times). Line S30 Bellinzona ↔ Luino is served every 2 hours, with a single daily train continuing to Busto Arsizio.

The staff that runs the trains in Italy is supplied by Trenord, and by Swiss Federal Railways for the trains running in Switzerland.

The fleet consists of
 19 RABe 524.0/ETR 150 Stadler FLIRT 4-car EMUs (3 of them temporary in service on Genève-La Plaine line)
 11 RABe 524.1/ETR 524 Stadler FLIRT 6-car EMUs
 some NPZ RBDe 560 EMUs with NPZ driving trailers and EW 1 or EW 2 intermediate coaches (exact number is unknown but variable)

The Stadler FLIRT trains are equipped to run in both Switzerland and Italy, while the older NPZ trains are used only on peak hours trains in Switzerland.

The trains are always accompanied by a driver only, except for the S10 only in the Italian section Chiasso - Albate, where there is also a staff member accompanying the train (conductor).

TILO is a member of the Arcobaleno tariff network.

Lines currently managed

TILO currently operates lines S10, S20, S30, S40, S50 and S90, as well as the RegioExpress line RE80 between Locarno and Milan.

All routes operate in both Italy and Switzerland except the S20 and S90 which are Swiss only.

References

External links
TILO

Railway companies of Switzerland
Railway companies of Italy
Rail transport in Ticino
Railway companies established in 2004
Swiss companies established in 2004
Italian companies established in 2004